In music, Op. 119 stands for Opus number 119. Compositions that are assigned this number include:

 Beethoven – Bagatelles, Op. 119
 Brahms – Four Pieces for Piano
 Klebe – Gervaise Macquart
 Prokofiev – Cello Sonata
 Reger – Die Weihe der Nacht
 Saint-Saëns – Cello Concerto No. 2
 Schumann – 3 Gedichte